The Pagoda was a Chinese restaurant in Portland, Oregon's Hollywood District, in the United States.

Description

The Pagoda was a Chinese restaurant in northeast Portland's Hollywood neighborhood. The business was housed in an "ornate, orange-tiled" building, with an exterior described as "unique" by Nathalie Weinstein of the Daily Journal of Commerce. The interior had koi pond with a small bridge for guests to cross.

History
The restaurant opened in 1940. Louis Lee purchased the business in 1946. Lee operated the restaurant until 2008, when Sunny Chan took over. The Pagoda closed in late 2008, and the building was converted into a Key Bank branch. The restaurant's gold-and-red arch was salvaged and installed at the Expatriate.

See also

 History of Chinese Americans in Portland, Oregon
 List of Chinese restaurants
 List of defunct restaurants of the United States

References

1940 establishments in Oregon
2008 disestablishments in Oregon
Defunct Chinese restaurants in Portland, Oregon
Hollywood, Portland, Oregon
Restaurants disestablished in 2008
Restaurants established in 1940